Gable is an English surname. Notable people with the surname include:

 Ashley Gable, American screenwriter and producer
 Bob Gable, American businessman and political candidate
 Brian Gable, Canadian cartoonist
 C. J. Gable, American football player
 Chad Gable (born 1986), ring name of American professional wrestler Charles Betts
 Christopher Gable, English dancer and actor
 Clark Gable (1901–1960), American actor
 Clark James Gable (1988-2019), American actor, also known as Clark Gable III, grandson of Clark Gable
 Dan Gable (born 1948), American freestyle wrestler and wrestling coach
 Ellen Gable, American author
 Eric Gable, American singer
 Gerry Gable, British activist
 Guitar Gable, American musician
 Howard Gable, Australian record producer
 Jeremy Gable, American playwright
 John Allen Gable, American historian
 June Gable, American actress
 Mark Gable, member of the Choirboys

See also 

 Gable 

English-language surnames